Goolmangar is a village in the northern part of the Australian state of New South Wales, close to Nimbin. It is part of City of Lismore. It is mostly farms. Its primary school once was attended by Julian Assange. 

Towns in New South Wales
Northern Rivers
City of Lismore